The Forty-first, may refer to

The Forty-First (novel), a novel by Boris Lavrenyov
The Forty-First (1927 film), a film adaptation of the novel by Yakov Protazanov
The Forty-First (1956 film), a film adaptation of the novel by Grigori Chukhrai